Abdulrazak Gurnah  (born 20 December 1948) is a Tanzanian-born  British novelist and academic. He was born in the Sultanate of Zanzibar and moved to the United Kingdom in the 1960s as a refugee during the Zanzibar Revolution. His novels include Paradise (1994), which was shortlisted for both the Booker and the Whitbread Prize; Desertion (2005); and By the Sea (2001), which was longlisted for the Booker and shortlisted for the Los Angeles Times Book Prize.

Gurnah was awarded the 2021 Nobel Prize in Literature "for his uncompromising and compassionate penetration of the effects of colonialism and the fates of the refugee in the gulf between cultures and continents". He is Emeritus Professor of English and Postcolonial Literatures at the University of Kent.

Early life and education 
Abdulrazak Gurnah was born on 20 December 1948 in the Sultanate of Zanzibar. He left the island, which later became part of Tanzania, at the age of 18 following the overthrow of the ruling Arab elite in the Zanzibar Revolution, arriving in England in 1968 as a refugee. He is of Arab heritage, and his father and uncle were businessmen who had immigrated from Yemen. Gurnah has been quoted saying, "I came to England when these words, such as asylum-seeker, were not quite the same – more people are struggling and running from terror states." 

He initially studied at Christ Church College, Canterbury, whose degrees were at the time awarded by the University of London. He then moved to the University of Kent, where he earned his PhD with a thesis titled Criteria in the Criticism of West African Fiction, in 1982.

Career 
From 1980 to 1983, Gurnah lectured at Bayero University Kano in Nigeria. He then became a professor of English and postcolonial literature at the University of Kent, where he taught until his retirement in 2017; he is now professor emeritus of English and postcolonial literatures at the university. 

Although Gurnah's novels were received positively by critics, they were not commercially successful and, in some cases, were not published outside the United Kingdom. After he was awarded the Nobel Prize for Literature in 2021, publishers and booksellers struggled to keep up with the increase in demand for his work. It was not until after the Nobel announcement that Gurnah received bids from American publishers for his novel Afterlives; Riverhead Books plans to release it in August 2022. Riverhead also acquired rights to By the Sea and Desertion, two Gurnah works that had gone out of print.

Writing 
Alongside his work in academia, Gurnah is a creative writer and novelist. He is the author of many short stories, essays and 10 novels. 

While his first language is Swahili, he has used English as his literary language. However, Gurnah integrates bits of Swahili, Arabic and German into most of his writings. He has said that he had to push back against publishers to continue this practice and they would have preferred to "italicize or Anglicize Swahili and Arabic references and phrases in his books". Gurnah has criticized the practices in both British and American publishing that want to "make the alien seem alien" by marking "foreign" terms and phrases with italics or by putting them in a glossary. As academic Hamid Dabashi notes, Gurnah "is integral to the manner in which Asian and African migratory and diasporic experiences have enriched and altered English language and literature. ... Calling authors like Gurnah diasporic, exilic, or any other such self-alienating term conceals the fact that English was native to him even before he set foot in England. English colonial officers had brought it home to him."

Gurnah began writing out of homesickness during his 20s. He started with writing down thoughts in his diary, which turned into longer reflections about home, and eventually grew into writing fictional stories about other people. This created a habit of using writing as a tool to understand and record his experience of being a refugee, living in another land and the feeling of being displaced. These initial stories eventually became Gurnah's first novel, Memory of Departure (1987), which he wrote alongside his Ph.D. dissertation. This first book set the stage for his ongoing exploration of the themes of "the lingering trauma of colonialism, war and displacement" throughout his subsequent novels, short stories and critical essays.

Consistent themes run through Gurnah's writing, including exile, displacement, belonging, colonialism and broken promises by the state. Most of his novels tell stories about people living in the developing world, affected by war or crisis, who may not be able to tell their own stories.

Much of Gurnah's work is set on the coast of East Africa and many of his novels' protagonists were born in Zanzibar. Though Gurnah has not returned to live in Tanzania since he left at 18, he has said that his homeland "always asserts himself in his imagination, even when he deliberately tries to set his stories elsewhere."

Literary critic Bruce King posits that Gurnah's novels place East African protagonists in their broader international context, observing that in Gurnah's fiction "Africans have always been part of the larger, changing world". According to King, Gurnah's characters are often uprooted, alienated, unwanted and therefore are, or feel, resentful victims". Felicity Hand suggests that Gurnah's novels Admiring Silence (1996), By the Sea (2001) and Desertion (2005) all concern "the alienation and loneliness that emigration can produce and the soul-searching questions it gives rise to about fragmented identities and the very meaning of 'home'." She observes that Gurnah's characters typically do not succeed abroad following their migration, using irony and humour to respond to their situation.

Novelist Maaza Mengiste has described Gurnah's works by saying: "He has written work that is absolutely unflinching and yet at the same time completely compassionate and full of heart for people of East Africa. [...] He is writing stories that are often quiet stories of people who aren’t heard, but there’s an insistence there that we listen."

Aiming to build the readership for Gurnah's writing in Tanzania, the first translator of his novels into Swahili, academic Dr Ida Hadjivayanis of the School of Oriental and African Studies, has said: "I think if his work could be read in East Africa it would have such an impact. ... We can't change our reading culture overnight, so for him to be read the first steps would be to include Paradise and After Lives in the school curriculum."

Other work 
Gurnah edited two volumes of Essays on African Writing and has published articles on a number of contemporary postcolonial writers, including V. S. Naipaul, Salman Rushdie and Zoë Wicomb. He is the editor of A Companion to Salman Rushdie (Cambridge University Press, 2007). Since 1987 he has been a contributing editor of Wasafiri and he is on the magazine's advisory board. He has been a judge for awards including the Caine Prize for African Writing, the Booker Prize. and the RSL Literature Matters Awards.

Awards and honours 
Gurnah's 1994 novel Paradise was shortlisted for the Booker, the Whitbread and the Writers' Guild Prizes as well as the ALOA Prize for the best Danish translation. His novel By the Sea (2001) was longlisted for the Booker and shortlisted for the Los Angeles Times Book Prize, while Desertion (2005) was shortlisted for the 2006 Commonwealth Writers' Prize.

In 2006 Gurnah was elected a fellow of the Royal Society of Literature. In 2007 he won the RFI Témoin du Monde (Witness of the world) award in France for By the Sea. 

On 7October 2021 he was awarded the Nobel Prize in Literature for 2021 "for his uncompromising and compassionate penetration of the effects of colonialism and the fates of the refugee in the gulf between cultures and continents". Gurnah was the first Black writer to receive the prize since 1993, when Toni Morrison won it, and the first African writer since 1991, when Nadine Gordimer was the recipient.

Personal life 
Gurnah lives in Canterbury and has British citizenship. He maintains close ties with Tanzania, where he still has family and where he says he goes when he can: "I am from there. In my mind I live there."

Writings

Novels 
Memory of Departure (1987)
Pilgrims Way (1988)
Dottie (1990)
Paradise (1994) (shortlisted for the Booker Prize and the Whitbread Prize; selected for the Big Jubilee Read)
Admiring Silence (1996)
By the Sea (2001) (longlisted for the Booker Prize and shortlisted for the Los Angeles Times Book Prize)
Desertion (2005)
The Last Gift (2011)
Gravel Heart (2017)
Afterlives (2020)

Short stories 
"Cages" (1984), in African Short Stories, edited by Chinua Achebe and Catherine Lynette Innes, Heinemann Educational Books. 
"Bossy" (1994), in African Rhapsody: Short Stories of the Contemporary African Experience, edited by Nadežda Obradović. Anchor Books. 
"Escort" (1996), in Wasafiri, vol. 11, no. 23, 44–48.  
"The Photograph of the Prince" (2012), in Road Stories: New Writing Inspired by Exhibition Road, edited by Mary Morris. Royal Borough of Kensington & Chelsea, London. 
"My Mother Lived on a Farm in Africa" (2006), in NW 14: The Anthology of New Writing, Volume 14, selected by Lavinia Greenlaw and Helon Habila, London: Granta Books
"The Arriver's Tale", in Refugee Tales, edited by David Herd and Anna Pincus (Comma Press, 2016)
"The Stateless Person's Tale", in Refugee Tales III, edited by David Herd and Anna Pincus (Comma Press, 2019)

Non-fiction: essays and criticism 
 "Matigari: A Tract of Resistance." In: Research in African Literatures, vol. 22, no. 4, Indiana University Press, 1991, pp. 169–72. .
 "Imagining the Postcolonial Writer." In: Reading the 'New' Literatures in a Postcolonial Era. Edited by Susheila Nasta. D. S. Brewer, Cambridge, 2000. .
 "The Wood of the Moon." In: Transition, no. 88, Indiana University Press, Hutchins Center for African and African American Research at Harvard University, 2001, pp. 88–113. .
 "Themes and Structures in Midnight's Children". In: The Cambridge Companion to Salman Rushdie. Edited by Abdulrazak Gurnah. Cambridge University Press, 2007. .
  "Mid Morning Moon". In: Wasafiri (3 May 2011), vol. 26, no. 2, pp. 25–29. . 
 
 "Learning to Read". In: Matatu, no. 46, 2015, pp. 23–32, 268.

As editor 
 Essays on African Writing (Pearson Education Limited, 1995)
 A Companion to Salman Rushdie (Cambridge University Press, 2007)

References

Sources

Further reading 
 
 Jones, Nisha (2005). "Abdulrazak Gurnah in conversation". Wasafiri, 20:46, 37–42.  . 
 

Whyte, Philip (2004). "Heritage as Nightmare: The Novels of Abdulrazak Gurnah", in: Commonwealth Essays and Studies 27, no. 1:11–18.

External links
 
 Abdulrazak Gurnah at RCW Literary Agency.

1948 births
20th-century male writers
21st-century male writers
Living people
Academics of the University of Kent
Alumni of Canterbury Christ Church University
Alumni of the University of Kent
Fellows of the Royal Society of Literature
Male essayists
Male short story writers
Nobel laureates in Literature
Tanzanian Nobel laureates
Tanzanian emigrants to the United Kingdom
Tanzanian novelists
Zanzibari people
Tanzanian people of Yemeni descent
Tanzanian non-fiction writers
Tanzanian academics
Academic staff of Bayero University Kano